Tomasz Bednarek and Jerzy Janowicz were the defending champions but decided Janowicz not to participate.
Bednarek partnered with Filip Polášek, but lost in the first round.

Jesse Huta Galung and Igor Sijsling won the title, defeating Eric Butorac and Raven Klaasen in the final, 4–6, 7–6(7–2), [10–7].

Seeds

Draw

Draw

References
 Main Draw

Ethias Trophy - Doubles
2013 Doubles